Cornelius Patrick "Neil" O'Donnell (April 17, 1914 – December 27, 1996) was an American professional basketball player. He played for the Buffalo Bisons in the National Basketball League for nine games during the 1937–38 season and averaged 3.9 points per game.

Neil was the younger brother of Jim O'Donnell, who also played on the Bisons in 1937–38.

References

1914 births
1996 deaths
American men's basketball players
Basketball players from Buffalo, New York
Buffalo Bisons (NBL) players
Canisius Golden Griffins men's basketball players
Centers (basketball)
Forwards (basketball)